Lot and His Daughters is a c.1520 oil on panel painting. It was produced by an unknown artist working in Leyden or Antwerp, though it was long attributed to Lucas van Leyden. It is now in the Louvre, having entered its collection in 1900.

Similar works

References

1520s paintings
Anonymous
Paintings in the Louvre by Dutch, Flemish and German artists